Phthitia is a subgenus of flies belonging to the family Lesser Dung flies.

Species
P. alexandri Richards, 1955
P. charpentieri Marshall & Smith, 1995
P. cortesi Marshall & Smith, 1995
P. gonzalezi Marshall & Smith, 1995
P. miradorensis Marshall & Smith, 1995
P. sanctaehelenae (Richards, 1951)
P. selkirki (Enderlein, 1938)
P. venosa Enderlein, 1938

References

Sphaeroceridae
Diptera of South America
Insect subgenera